In Islamic tradition, Haizum is the horse of the archangel Gabriel. It is a white, flaming, spiritual horse that has wings like that of a pegasus and can fly swiftly from one cosmic plane to another in a second. Haizum was God's gift to Gabriel for pleasing Him.

Also, based on the Authentic Hadith reported In Sahih Muslim, Haizum is the name of an Angel from the 3rd Heaven, whom Allah (God) sent among other angels as reinforcements to help the Muslim veterans who took part in the legendary Battle of Badr.

References

Horses in mythology
Gabriel
Islamic legendary creatures